Coatbridge is a town which grew out of a series of 18th-century hamlets on the road between Airdrie and Glasgow. During the 19th century these hamlets grew into the modern-day town of Coatbridge. A number of these hamlets constitute the neighbourhoods of Coatbridge. Overlaid on the older hamlets are modern-day council estates built as a part of programme of social housing construction in the 1930s and 1950s.

There are approximately 27 distinct neighbourhoods associated with Coatbridge. A number of these neighbourhoods overlap geographically.

Generally speaking, Coatbridge's neighbourhoods are working class in composition, although the sandstone buildings of the Drumpellier, Blairhill and Dunbeth areas are regarded as the more affluent areas of Coatbridge.

List of neighbourhoods in Coatbridge
 South Coatbridge
 Kirkwood
 Kirkshaws
 Whifflet
 Carnbroe
 Dundyvan
 Sikeside
 Rosehall
 Shawhead
 Greenend
 Barrowfield
 Old Monkland
 Cuparhead
 North Coatbridge
Drumpellier
 Townhead
 Espieside
 Gartsherrie
 Greenhill
 Parklands
 Blairhill
 Sunnyside
 Cliftonville
 Coatdyke
 Central Coatbridge
 Dunbeth
 Langloan
 Summerlee
 Victoria Park
 Whitelaw

References

External links
North Lanarkshire Council
Coatbridge Museum
Interactive map of the neighbourhoods and landmarks of Coatbridge

Areas
Coatbridge